Reymondia minor is a species of small  freshwater snail, an aquatic gastropod mollusc in the family Paludomidae. This species is found in Burundi, the Democratic Republic of the Congo, Tanzania, and Zambia. Its natural habitat is freshwater lakes.

References

Paludomidae
Gastropods described in 1889
Taxonomy articles created by Polbot